Rubus heterophyllus is a rare North American species of flowering plant in the rose family. It has been found in eastern Canada (Québec) and in scattered locations in the eastern United States (New York, West Virginia, Maryland).

The genetics of Rubus is extremely complex, so that it is difficult to decide on which groups should be recognized as species. There are many rare species with limited ranges such as this. Further study is suggested to clarify the taxonomy.

References

External links
photo of herbarium specimen at Missouri Botanical Garden

heterophyllus
Plants described in 1814
Flora of Quebec
Flora of the Eastern United States
Flora without expected TNC conservation status